Ross Smith Secondary School was a high school in Northfield, South Australia.  The original Northfield High School was opened in 1968. The School changed its name to the Ross Smith Secondary School in 1996 as a result of the amalgamation of Nailsworth and Northfield High Schools.  The school had classes from Year 8 through to 12. The school's last principal was Judith O'Brien. The motto of the school was "Building a culture of success." The school was named after the aviator, Ross Macpherson Smith in part due to a large pine tree situated on the former oval of the school, thought to have been planted on the site where the Vickers Vimy came to a stop marking the end of the first flight from England to Australia. The tree has been retained and is now part of a small park.

The key values of Ross Smith Secondary School were Care, Acceptance, Equality, Openness, Independence, Accountability and Resilience.

Ross Smith Secondary School closed in 2011 and is now part of Roma Mitchell Secondary College with the majority of the former buildings being demolished in 2014 and replaced with new Lightsview developments.

In February 2015 the owner of the former school CIC Northgate revealed plans to turn the remaining structures into a childcare centre.

Notable former students
 David Campbell - Singer, stage performer and television presenter

References

High schools in South Australia
Educational institutions established in 1996
Educational institutions disestablished in 2011
Demolished buildings and structures in South Australia
Buildings and structures demolished in 2014
1996 establishments in Australia